Hapoel Iksal is an Israeli football club based in Iksal. The club currently plays in Liga Leumit.

History
The club played mostly in the lower divisions of Israeli football. In the 1998–99 season, the club finished third in Liga Alef North division and promoted to Liga Artzit, which became the third tier of Israeli football due to the formation of the Israeli Premier League in that season. Hapoel Iksal's spell in Liga Artzit lasted one season, as they finished bottom at the 1999–2000 season with only 2 wins out of 33 matches and relegated to back Liga Alef. In the following season, the club finished bottom in Liga Alef North and suffered subsequent relegation, this time to Liga Bet, the fifth tier of Israeli football at the time.

In the 2007–08 season, the club finished runners-up in Liga Bet North B division and qualified for the Promotion play-offs. However, the club was eventually expelled from the play-offs, following an attempt for match fixing, prior to their match with Beitar Haifa. As a result, the club was punished by 15 points deduction in the following season (which later became 17).

In the 2012–13 season, the club finished third in Liga Bet North B (now as the fourth tier) and qualified once more for the Promotion play-offs. After beating F.C. Tzeirei Tur'an, Maccabi Ahi Iksal and Hapoel Kaukab, they faced Maccabi Kafr Kanna in the decisive promotion/relegation play-offs. After 1–1 draw in 120 minutes, Iksal lost in penalties and remained in Liga Bet.

In the 2014–15 season, the club finished third in Liga Bet North B, and this time had a successful Promotion play-offs. After beating Maccabi Ein Mahil, Hapoel Daliyat al-Karmel and Maccabi Ironi Acre, Hapoel Iksal faced Hapoel Asi Gilboa in the decisive promotion/relegation play-offs. Iksal won 1–0 and were promoted to Liga Alef. In the 2017–18 season Iksal finished 1st and were promoted to Liga Leumit for the first time in the Club history.

Current squad
 As of 16 February 2022

Honours

League

Cups

External links
Hapoel Iksal Imad  The Israel Football Association

References

Iksal
Iksal
Association football clubs established in 1971
1971 establishments in Israel
Arab-Israeli football clubs